Dominik Kočik (born 22 June 2009) is a Slovak steel-tip and soft-tip darts player who currently plays in World Darts Federation (WDF) events. He is a
soft-tip and steel-tip Slovak Youth Darts Champion and also the winner of the Dutch Open for younger boys.

Career
Dominik was a multiple winner of the youth's regional masters tournaments at the soft-tip darts. In 2020, he was the youngest participant at the Slovak Open and reached the second round. He has also been nominated to the East Slovak Regional Premier League for adults.

Kočik is the winner of the 2021 Slovak Youth Championship on steel-tip and soft-tip darts. In the same year, he made his debut at the senior and youth Czech Open. In the tournament for adults he ended the competition in the second round, while in the youth tournament he reached the quarter-finals, where he lost to Tomáš Houdek. At the end of the year, he took part in the qualification for the 2022 WDF World Boys Championship, but he lost to Luis Liptow by 1–4 in legs.

At the start of 2022, he sign a contract with Mission Darts. In February, he again played at the Slovak Open and reached a semi-finals in youth's competition, where he lost to eventual winner Rajmund Papp by 0–3 in legs. In March, he took part in the International Youth Challenge in Vienna, which he was eliminated in the quarter-finals by Robin Stegler. In June, he took part in the Dutch Open tournament for boys younger than 14 years old. In the final he beat Koen Schreuders by 3–2 in legs.

References

2009 births
Living people
Slovak darts players
Sportspeople from Prešov